Paul Cutler (born 18 June 1946) is an English former professional footballer who played in the Football League, as a winger.

Career
Cutler was born in Welwyn Garden City and began his youth career with Crystal Palace. He signed professional terms in April 1964 and made his senior debut in November in an away 0–0 draw in the League Cup against Leicester City. He made a scoring league debut in March 1965, in a 1–1 away draw against Northampton Town and made two further appearances that season.

In the 1965–1966 season, Cutler made a further seven appearances, without scoring and at the end of the season, moved into non-league football with Nuneaton Borough. He subsequently played non-league football for Romford, Dover and Ramsgate.

References

External links
Cutler at holmesdale.net
Crystal Palace players at neilbrown.com

1946 births
Living people
Sportspeople from Welwyn Garden City
English footballers
Association football wingers
English Football League players
Crystal Palace F.C. players
Nuneaton Borough F.C. players
Romford F.C. players
Dover F.C. players
Ramsgate F.C. players